Doğanköy can refer to:

 Doğanköy, İliç
 Doğanköy, Kale
 Doğanköy, Kemah
 Doğanköy, Ergani
 Doğanköy, Osmancık
 Doğanköy, Şenkaya
 Doğanköy, Ulus
 the Turkish name for Thermeia